SMAD family member 6, also known as SMAD6, is a protein that in humans is encoded by the SMAD6 gene.

SMAD6 is a protein that, as its name describes, is a homolog of the Drosophila gene "mothers against decapentaplegic". It belongs to the SMAD family of proteins, which belong to the  TGFβ superfamily of modulators. Like many other TGFβ family members SMAD6 is involved in cell signalling. It acts as a regulator of TGFβ family (such as bone morphogenetic proteins) activity by competing with SMAD4 and preventing the transcription of SMAD4's gene products. There are two known isoforms of this protein.

Nomenclature
The SMAD proteins are homologs of both the drosophila protein, mothers against decapentaplegic (MAD) and the C. elegans protein SMA. The name is a combination of the two. During Drosophila research, it was found that a mutation in the gene MAD in the mother repressed the gene decapentaplegic in the embryo. The phrase "Mothers against" was added as a humorous take-off on organizations opposing various issues e.g., Mothers Against Drunk Driving, or MADD; and based on a tradition of such unusual naming within the gene research community.

Disease associations 
Heterozygous, damaging mutations in SMAD6 are the most frequent genetic cause of non-syndromic craniosynostosis identified to date.

Interactions 
Mothers against decapentaplegic homolog 6 has been shown to interact with:
 HOXC8, 
 MAP3K7,
 Mothers against decapentaplegic homolog 7, 
 PIAS4,  and
 STRAP.

References

Further reading 

 
 
 
 
 
 
 
 
 
 
 
 
 
 
 
 

Transcription factors
Developmental genes and proteins
MH1 domain
MH2 domain
Human proteins